The Bank of Guangzhou Tower is a fifty-seven-story,  skyscraper in Guangzhou, Guangdong, China. Construction of the tower was completed in 2012. The tower is the eighth-tallest in Guangzhou and the 168th-tallest in the world.

See also 
 List of tallest buildings in the world
 List of tallest buildings in China
 List of tallest buildings in Asia

References

Skyscraper office buildings in Guangzhou
Office buildings completed in 2012